KIXB (103.3 FM, "KIX 103") is a radio station licensed to serve El Dorado, Arkansas, United States. The station is owned by Noalmark Broadcasting Corporation.

KIXB broadcasts a country music format.

The station was assigned the KIXB call sign by the Federal Communications Commission on May 11, 1993.

References

External links
KIXB official website

IXB
Country radio stations in the United States
El Dorado, Arkansas
Noalmark Broadcasting Corporation radio stations
1993 establishments in Arkansas
Radio stations established in 1993